The Alfa Romeo 500A was a bus produced by Alfa Romeo from 1945 to 1948.

History
The bus had an advanced form for the 1940s and was used for tourist trips in Italy. The bus body was from Orlandi and had a 130 HP engine. It had seats for 26 passengers.

Starring
The bus starred in the 1961 Italian movie Il federale.

Production
About 40 units were produced.

See also
 List of buses

500A